Geygan (also romanized as Gaigan, Gaygīn, Gey Gen, Gīgan, Gigen and Gīkan) is a village in Jask Rural District, in the Central District of Jask County, Hormozgan Province, Iran. At the 2006 census, its population was 270, in 55 families.

References 

Populated places in Jask County